Anton Sergeyevich Polyutkin (born 2 February 1993) is a Russian football defender. He plays for FC KAMAZ Naberezhnye Chelny.

Career
Polyutkin made his debut in the Russian Football National League for FC Yenisey Krasnoyarsk on 27 October 2013 in a game against FC Arsenal Tula. In March 2017, he joined Moldovan club Academia Chișinău; he made his debut against Saxan on 17 March.

References

External links
 
 

1993 births
People from Naberezhnye Chelny
Sportspeople from Tatarstan
Living people
Russian footballers
Russia youth international footballers
Association football defenders
PFC CSKA Moscow players
FC Yenisey Krasnoyarsk players
FC Solyaris Moscow players
FC Montana players
FC Academia Chișinău players
FC Sibir Novosibirsk players
FC Tyumen players
FC KAMAZ Naberezhnye Chelny players
Russian First League players
Russian Second League players
First Professional Football League (Bulgaria) players
Moldovan Super Liga players
Russian expatriate footballers
Expatriate footballers in Bulgaria
Russian expatriate sportspeople in Bulgaria
Expatriate footballers in Moldova
Russian expatriate sportspeople in Moldova